Ethiopia's National Youth Movement for Freedom and Democracy, popularly known as Qeerroo, is a social movement organized with ideology of Oromo nationalism in Ethiopia. In traditional Oromo culture the term means "bachelor" or youth but within the political movement that shares the same name, it symbolizes the Oromo struggle for increased political freedom, greater ethnic representation in government, "... an entire generation of newly assertive Ethiopian youth,".

The BBC has described Qeerroo as being Ethiopia's National Youth Movement for Freedom and Democracy, which calls itself Qeerroo Bilisummaa Oromoo.

History
The Qeerroo, also known as the Qubee generation, "first emerged in 1991 with the participation of the Oromo Liberation Front (OLF) in the transitional government of Ethiopia." Qeerroos also played a key role in the 2016 Oromo Protests. Jawar Mohammed, a Qeerroo, played a key role in founding the NYMFD.

The Qeerroo movement inspired many marginalized ethnic to create their own youth movement. Some of youth movements are Ejjetto, Barbaarta and Zarma. Both the Somali youth Barbaarta demand to end Abdi Illey's Presidency and the Sidama youth Ejjatto demand to statehood of Sidama succeeded.
They staged nationwide protest rallies in July 2020 following the assassination of Oromo singer, Hacaaluu Hundeessaa.

References

2011 establishments in Ethiopia
Political movements in Ethiopia
Organizations established in 1991
Youth movements
Oromo people